The 1984–85 Lehigh Engineers men's basketball team represented Lehigh University during the 1984–85 NCAA Division I men's basketball season. The Engineers, led by head coach Tom Schneider, played their home games at Stabler Arena and were members of the East Coast Conference. They finished the season 12–19, 6–8 in ECC play to finish in sixth place in the conference.

Following the regular season, Lehigh surprisingly won the ECC tournament to earn the conference's automatic bid into the 1985 NCAA tournament. This was the program's first NCAA Tournament appearance. As the 16 seed in the East region, they fell to No. 1 seed and eventual National runner-up Georgetown in the opening round.

After the season, Coach Schneider left the program to take the head coaching job at Penn. Schneider was replaced by assistant coach Fran McCaffery.

Roster

Schedule and results

|-
!colspan=9 style=| Regular season

|-
!colspan=9 style=| ECC Tournament

|-
!colspan=9 style=| 1985 NCAA tournament

References

Lehigh Mountain Hawks men's basketball seasons
Lehigh
Lehigh
1984 in sports in Pennsylvania
1985 in sports in Pennsylvania